Won by Losing is a 1916 British silent drama film directed by Bertram Phillips and starring Queenie Thomas and Frank McClellan.

Cast
 Frank McClellan 
 Queenie Thomas as Polly / Daphne

References

Bibliography
 Low, Rachael. History of the British Film, 1914-1918. Routledge, 2005.

External links

1916 films
1916 drama films
British drama films
British silent short films
Films directed by Bertram Phillips
Films set in England
British black-and-white films
1910s English-language films
1910s British films
Silent drama films